The 2017-18 Spanish Campeonato Nacional Liga is the inaugural season of the Spanish Campeonato Nacional Liga, a new rugby league competition currently being held in Spain. It runs from November to April, with ten rounds followed by playoffs and a final.

Teams
 Valencian Warriors
 Ontinyent
 Custodians Madrid
 Bufals XIII
 Xativa Roosters
 Torrent Tigers

Results
LEGA MFB - Serie A
Season 2017-18

Round 1

Bufals XIII 39-38  Xàtiva Roosters

Valencian Warriors 30-0  Custodians Madrid *

Rugby Ontinyent 4-80  Tigres Torrent

 
Round 2

Tigres Torrent 32-12  Valencian Warriors

Xàtiva Roosters 82-14  Rugby Ontinyent

Custodians Madrid * 0-30  Bufals XIII

Round 3

Bufals XIII  20-50  Tigres Torrent

Valencian Warriors 70-14  Rugby Ontinyent

Custodians Madrid 40-8 Xàtiva Roosters

 
Round 4

Tigres Torrent 30-0 Custodians Madrid *

Valencian Warriors 50-8  Xàtiva Roosters

Rugby Ontinyent 36-52  Bufals XIII

Round 5

Bufals XIII  28-60  Valencian Warriors

Xàtiva Roosters 14-52  Tigres Torrent

Custodians Madrid *  0-30 Rugby Ontinyent

Round 6

Xàtiva Roosters 42-36 Bufals XIII

Custodians Madrid *  0-30 Valencian Warriors

Tigres Torrent 80-10  Rugby Ontinyent

 
Round 7

Valencian Warriors 20-42  Tigres Torrent

Rugby Ontinyent 26-48  Xàtiva Roosters

Bufals XIII 30-0  Custodians Madrid *

Round 8

Tigres Torrent 50-0  Bufals XIII

Rugby Ontinyent 12-82  Valencian Warriors

Xativa Roosters 30-0  Custodians Madrid *

Round 9

Custodians Madrid * 0-30 Tigres Torrent

Xàtiva Roosters 28-18  Valencian Warriors

Bufals XIII 0-33 Rugby Ontinyent

Round 10

Valencian Warriors vs Bufals XIII

Tigres Torrent 48-16  Xàtiva Roosters

Rugby Ontinyent 30-0  Custodians Madrid *

Ladder
Tigres Torrent - 30 
Valencian Warriors - 18 
Xativa Roosters - 16 
Bufals XIII - 13 
Rugby Ontinyent - 9 
Atletico Custodians Madrid - 0

References

External links

Rugby league in Spain
Men's sports competitions in Spain
2017 in rugby league
2018 in rugby league
2017 in Spanish sport
2018 in Spanish sport